Kata Csondor (born 15 March 1978, Budapest, Hungary) is a Hungarian voice actress, singer, and songwriter.

Csondor has dubbed since childhood. One of her most well-known dubs was that of Chloe Sullivan in the TV series Smallville. She also sings. In the Christmas season of 2009 she sang the "Hóban ébred majd az ünnep, minden percben nevet ránk" jingle for the Hungarian branch of T-Mobile's advertising, which was later brought back by popular demand. Ágnes Szabó wrote the lyrics, while Gábor Madarász wrote the music. In 2012, she released her first album: "Hóban ébred...az ünnep dalai", which charted on the "MAHASZ Top 40" list, and in 2013, was nominated for the Fonogram award for "Best home entertainment musical album of the year." In December 2016, it was announced that she would compete at A Dal 2017, the national selection for Hungary in the Eurovision Song Contest 2017, with the song Create. She participated in the first heat and was eliminated.

References

1978 births
Living people
Musicians from Budapest
Hungarian voice actresses
21st-century Hungarian women singers
Hungarian songwriters